Charles Francis Summers (1858-1945) was an Australian sculptor. The son of the British-born sculptor Charles Summers, he worked mainly in Rome, travelling back and forth to Australia to sell his pieces.

Career
Summers lived in Rome for thirty years, studying sculpture under his father, and drawing with Italian painter Ludovico Seitz.

In Melbourne, he had a studio in the Grosvenor Chambers, and later, in Jolimont. He was amongst the first to quarry marble in Victoria, in the area of Benambra.

Works

A selection of Summers's works is preserved in the Art Museum of Rotorua, New Zealand.

A number of Summers' sculptures including La Ballerina (c.1880s), The Four Seasons (Spring, Summer, Autumn, and Winter) (c. 1870s), and The Boxers are situated in the Royal Botanic Garden, Sydney. Five of his sculptures (Flight From Pompeii, Modesty, Rebekah, Ruth, and Susannah) along with the pavilion in which they are housed are listed on the Victorian Heritage Register and are located in the Ballarat Botanical Gardens. "The Shunammite Woman" and "An Episode of Pompeii"is held by the Bendigo Art Gallery.

References

External links
A Peverse Past: The Persistence Of Objects - thesis about Summers and his works (restricted access)
Charles Francis Summers: Australian Art and Artists file at the State Library Victoria

19th-century Australian sculptors
20th-century Australian sculptors
1857 births
1945 deaths
Place of birth missing
Place of death missing
Date of birth missing
Date of death missing
Victorian Heritage Register